Beginning in 1984, Soccer America Magazine began naming a college player of the year.  At the time Soccer America was the best source for U.S. soccer, especially collegiate soccer which was rarely covered by the national news services.  Consequently, its end of year awards have been recognized as among the most important and are listed by the NCAA in its official awards.

Men's
 2019 — Joe Bell, Virginia
 2018 — No winner announced
 2017 — Grant Lillard, Indiana
 2016 — Ian Harkes, Wake Forest
 2015 — Jordan Morris, Stanford
 2014 — Abu Danladi, UCLA
 2013 — Patrick Mullins, Maryland
 2012 — Patrick Mullins, Maryland
 2011 — Ben Speas, North Carolina
 2010 — Kofi Sarkodie, Akron
 2009 — Teal Bunbury, Akron
 2008 — Steve Zakuani, Akron
 2007 — O'Brian White, Connecticut
 2006 — Joseph Lapira, Notre Dame
 2005 — Jason Garey, Maryland
 2004 — Ryan Pore, Tulsa
 2003 — Joseph Ngwenya, Coastal Carolina
 2002 — Alecko Eskandarian, Virginia
 2001 — Luchi Gonzalez, SMU
 2000 — Chris Gbandi, Connecticut
 1999 — Aleksey Korol, Indiana
 1998 — Wojtek Krakowiak, Clemson
 1997 — Ben Olsen, Virginia
 1996 — Johnny Torres, Creighton
 1995 — Mike Fisher, Virginia
 1994 — A.J. Wood, Virginia
 1993 — Claudio Reyna, Virginia
 1992 — Claudio Reyna, Virginia
 1987-91 — No winner announced
 1986 — Paul Caligiuri, UCLA and John Kerr, Duke
 1985 — Michael Brady, American
 1984 — Paul DiBernardo, Indiana

Women's
 2014 — Dagny Brynjarsdottir, Florida State
 2013 — Morgan Brian, Virginia
 2012 — Crystal Dunn, North Carolina
 2011 — Lindsay Taylor, Stanford
 2010 — Christen Press, Stanford
 2009 — Kelley O'Hara, Stanford
 2008 — Casey Nogueira, North Carolina
 2007 — Lauren Cheney, UCLA
 2006 — Heather O'Reilly, North Carolina
 2005 — Christine Sinclair, Portland
 2004 — Katie Thorlakson, Notre Dame
 2003 — Lindsay Tarpley, North Carolina
 2002 — Christine Sinclair, Portland
 2001 — Aly Wagner, Santa Clara
 2000 — Anne Makinen, Notre Dame
 1999 — Lorrie Fair, North Carolina
 1998 — Danielle Fotopoulos, Florida
 1997 — Sara Whalen, Connecticut
 1996 — Debbie Keller, North Carolina
 1995 — Shannon MacMillan, Portland
 1994 — Tisha Venturini, North Carolina
 1993 — Mia Hamm, North Carolina
 1992 — Mia Hamm, North Carolina
 1991 — Julie Foudy, Stanford
 1990 — Kristine Lilly, North Carolina
 1989 — Shannon Higgins, North Carolina
 1988 — Shannon Higgins, North Carolina
 1987 — Michelle Akers, Central Florida
 1986 — April Heinrichs, North Carolina
 1985 — Lisa Gmitter, George Mason

See also

 List of sports awards honoring women
Hermann Trophy
ISAA Player of the Year (discontinued)

External links
 2006 NCAA Record Book - see p. 91
 Soccer America: Men's Player of the Year Listings
 Soccer America: Women's Player of the Year Listings

College soccer trophies and awards in the United States
US, college
Awards established in 1984
Women's association football player of the year awards
1984 establishments in the United States